The Canton of Le Grand-Quevilly is a canton situated in the Seine-Maritime département and in the Normandy region of northern France.

Geography 
An area of light industry and manufacturing situated on the left bank of the Seine, immediately south of Rouen in the arrondissement of Rouen, centred on the town of Le Grand-Quevilly.

Composition 
At the French canton reorganisation which came into effect in March 2015, the canton was expanded from 1 to 2 communes:
Le Grand-Quevilly
Petit-Couronne

Population

See also 
 Arrondissements of the Seine-Maritime department
 Cantons of the Seine-Maritime department
 Communes of the Seine-Maritime department

References

Grand-Quevilly